This is a list of destinations served by Smartwings (formerly a branch of Travel Service which has now adapted the same name) as of June 2019:

Destinations

References 

Lists of airline destinations